Lorenzo Polvani (born 26 July 1994) is an Italian professional footballer. He plays as a defender for Serie D club Ravenna.

Club career
Polvani made his Serie C debut for Pontedera on 31 August 2014 in a game against SPAL.

On 31 January 2020, he signed with Pianese. After making no appearances for Pianese, Polvani left the club on 23 October 2020 to join Serie D club San Donato.

On 7 August 2021 he joined Ravenna, newly relegated to Serie D.

References

External links
 

Living people
1994 births
People from Pistoia
Sportspeople from the Province of Pistoia
Association football defenders
Italian footballers
U.S. Pistoiese 1921 players
U.S. Città di Pontedera players
S.P.A.L. players
Empoli F.C. players
Ravenna F.C. players
Serie B players
Serie C players
Serie D players
Footballers from Tuscany